

The Angel Aircraft Corporation Model 44 Angel is a twin-engine STOL utility aircraft produced in the United States since the mid-1990s.  Designed by Carl Mortenson and The King's Engineering Fellowship to be well-suited for missionary work from remote locations around the world, it is a low-wing cantilever monoplane with a retractable tricycle undercarriage and eight seats.  The design is largely conventional, with the exception that the engine nacelles are mounted on top of the wings in a pusher configuration.  Construction is aluminum throughout the airframe.

Design work began at the home of designer Carl Mortenson in 1972, with work on the prototype beginning in 1977, also from the designer's home.  In 1980 the project was moved to the municipal airport in Orange City, Iowa.  The first flight took place on 13 January 1984, and FAA type certification was achieved on 20 October 1992.  Angel Aircraft Corporation manufactures the aircraft under a license agreement with The King's Engineering Fellowship.

Four aircraft were placed between 1984 and 2008 but Hubei Taihang Xinghe Aircraft Manufacturing of China acquired a production license in 2013.
The first Chinese example was substantially completed in May 2016 before the Hubei local government financed a manufacturing plant. The Model 44 was approved on 17 July 2015, by the Chinese National Civil Aviation Administration.

Crashes
On 14 December 2019, an Angel 44 crashed into a field of corn near the airport at Mareeba, Queensland, Australia at 11.15am during what is believed to be a training flight. The aircraft has been said to be the only example of the type in Australia. The pilot, William Scott-Bloxam (73) and male passenger (63) died at the scene of the incident.

Specifications

See also

References

External links

 Official Website
 Angel brochure on manufacturer's website
 Type Certificate Data Sheet A2WI

1980s United States civil utility aircraft
Engine-over-wing aircraft
Twin-engined pusher aircraft
Low-wing aircraft
Aircraft first flown in 1984
STOL aircraft